Kalgah Shiraz (also Romanized as Kalgāh Shīrāz; also known as Kalgāh Shīrāz-e Bālā, Kalgāh Shīrāz ‘Olyā, and Kalgān Shīrāz-e Bālā) is a village in Bakesh-e Yek Rural District, in the Central District of Mamasani County, Fars Province, Iran. At the 2006 census, its population was 327, in 80 families.

References 

Populated places in Mamasani County